John Benedict Hoyt (Jan. 31, 1794-July 4, 1862) was an American minister.

He was son of Thaddeus and Jemima (Benedict) Hoyt formerly of New Canaan, Connecticut, and was born Jan. 31, 1794, in Walton, New York in Delaware County.

He graduated from Yale University in 1814. After graduating, he spent a year in teaching in Dutchess County, New York, and soon after began the study of Theology with Rev. S. Williston, D. D., at Durham, New York.  In 1818 he was licensed to preach the gospel, and was soon ordained at Green, New York, where he remained Pastor of the Congregational church for many years. In 1829, he accepted a call to the second Congregational church in Coventry, New York, where he has since resided. He published a volume of Sermons, entitled, A Pastor's Tribute to his People (Norwich, New York, 1851; 12mo pp. 288) and several occasional discourses.

He was twice married, first to Miss Emelme C. Fenn, of Harpersfield, New York, and after her decease, to Miss Eliza Ann Phillips, of Coventry. He was the father of eight children, five of whom survived him.  He died in Coventry, Chenango County, New York, July 4, 1862, aged 68 years.

References

1794 births
1862 deaths
American Congregationalist ministers
Yale University alumni
People from Walton, New York
19th-century American clergy